"Roller Coaster" is a single by Canadian singer Justin Bieber. Released on November 25, 2013, the song is the eighth in Bieber's series Music Mondays, the first seven being "Heartbreaker" (October 7, 2013), "All That Matters" (October 14), "Hold Tight" (October 21), "Recovery" (October 28), "Bad Day" (November 4), "All Bad" (November 11) and "PYD" (November 18). Bieber released a new single every week for 10 weeks from October 7 to December 9, 2013. The Swedish Jazz Fusion band, Dirty Loops, covered the song on their album Loopified

Track listing

Chart performance

References

2013 singles
Justin Bieber songs
2013 songs
Island Records singles
Number-one singles in Denmark
Songs written by Rodney Jerkins
Songs written by Justin Bieber
Song recordings produced by Rodney Jerkins